The Australian Entertainment Mo Awards (commonly known informally as the Mo Awards) were an annual Australian entertainment industry award, that where established in 1975, to recognise achievements in live entertainment in Australia. They were last awarded in 2016.

Lucky Grills, actor and comedian  came up with the idea to create an awards show to celebrate Australian Variety, during a meeting in 1975.

The Mo Awards, initially were founded as the Star Awards and were a state honour in New South Wales only, local entertainers started the awards to promote the live entertainment industry in  New South Wales.

Johnny O'Keefe became chairman in 1976, and decided the awards should become an Australia-wide national awards program. Entertainer Don Lane then proposed the awards be renamed the Mo Awards in honour of Australian comedian and vaudevillian Roy Rene, who was famous for the character "Mo McCackie."

Categories

The award categories were reviewed annually and adapted to new trends in the Australian entertainment sector; categories included awards in: musical theatre, opera, Classical music, dance, comedy, rock music, jazz, country music, plays and variety shows.

Award winners

The Award winners are listed below.

1975: NSW Star Awards 
The NSW Star Awards took place on 10 November 1975 at South Sydney Seniors Leagues Club – Redfern. It was compered by Frank Newall.
AGENT OF THE YEAR: Brian Fogarty
BEST BALLET: Marrickville RSL (Greg Radford)
RESIDENT BAND UP TO 4 MEMBERS: Bob Taylor
RESIDENT BAND 5 OR MORE: Billy Burton
CLUB OF THE YEAR: Central Coast Leagues Club
MOST IMPROVED ACT: Llynda Nairn
ENCOURAGEMENT AWARD: Llynda Nairn
VOCAL DUO: Bill and Boyd
VOCAL GROUP: The Four Kinsmen
INSTRUMENTAL ACT: Mal Cunningham
SPECIALTY ACT: The Allisons
VERSATILE VARIETY ACT: Erris and Kevin
COMEDY ACT: Johnny Pace and Harriet
COMEDIAN: Slim De Gray
MALE VOCAL: Tony Pantano
FEMALE VOCAL: Jenifer Green
SPECIAL CONTRIBUTION AWARD: John Campbell
ACT OF THE YEAR: Don Lane and The Four Kinsmen (tie)

1976: 1st Mo Awards
The first MO Awards took place on 13 October 1976 at Revesby, New South Wales Revesby Workers Club. It was compered by Don Lane. This year the ceremony was telecast by the Nine Network.
BEST RESIDENT BAND: Billy Burton Orchestra
BEST BALLET: Joanne Ansell Dancers
BEST CLUB: Central Coast Leagues Club
MOST IMPROVED ACT: Mario D'Andrea
BEST VOCAL DUO: Bill and Boyd
BEST VOCAL GROUP: The Four Kinsmen
BEST SIGHT ACT: Ken Littlewood & Toshi
BEST INSTRUMENTALIST: The Toppanos
MOST VERSATILE ACT: Frankie Davidson
BEST COMEDY ACT: Johnny Pace and Harriet
COMEDIAN/COMEDIENNE: Slim De Grey
BEST MALE VOCAL: Barry Crocker
BEST FEMALE VOCAL: Julie Anthony
SPECIAL CONTRIBUTION AWARD: Johnny O'Keefe
ENTERTAINER OF THE YEAR: Barry Crocker

1977: 2nd Mo Awards
The second MO Awards took place on 16 November 1977 at Revesby, New South Wales Revesby Workers Club.

BEST RESIDENT BAND (5 OR LESS): Bob Taylor Quartet
BEST RESIDENT BAND (6 0R MORE): Billy Burton Orchestra
BEST RESIDENT or CASUAL BALLET: Joanne Ansell Dancers
CLUB PROVIDING BEST FACILITIES FOR PRESENTATION OF ENTERTAINMENT: Central Coast Leagues Club
MOST IMPROVED OR NEW ACT OF THE YEAR: Nairn Goby Duo
VARIETY PRODUCTION SHOW: Simone and Monique's Playgirls Revue
VOCAL DUO: Bill and Boyd
VOCAL GROUP (3 OR MORE): The Four Kinsmen
BEST SIGHT or SPECIALITY ACT: Ken Littlewood and Toshi & Barry Krause (Tie)
BEST INSTRUMENTAL ACT: The Toppanos
MOST VERSATILE ACT: Ross and Robyn
COMEDY ACT (2 OR MORE): The Rhythmaires
COMEDIAN/COMEDIENNE: Jan Adele
MALE VOCAL: Barry Crocker
FEMALE VOCAL: Julie Anthony
MO FELLOWSHIP AWARD: Bobby Le Brun
ENTERTAINER OF THE YEAR: Julie Anthony

1978: 3rd Mo Awards
The third MO Awards took place on 14 February 1979 at Revesby, New South Wales Revesby Workers Club. It was compered by Jimmy Hannan.

BEST RESIDENT BAND (5 OR LESS): Bob Taylor Quartet
BEST RESIDENT BAND (6 0R MORE): Billy Burton Orchestra
RESIDENT or CASUAL BALLET: Diane Heaton Dancers
CLUB PROVIDING BEST FACILITIES & SUPPORTING LOCAL ENTERTAINMENT: Epping RSL Club
VARIETY PRODUCTION SHOW: Simone and Monique's Playgirls Revue
INSTRUMENTAL/VOCAL SHOWGROUP: The Fugitives
VOCAL GROUP (2 OR MORE): The Four Kinsmen
INSTRUMENTALIST: Mal Cunningham
SPECIALITY ACT: Steve Bor
VERSATILE VARIETY ACT: Ross and Robyn
COMEDY ACT (2 OR MORE): The Rhythmaires
COMEDIAN/COMEDIENNE: Slim De Grey
MALE VOCAL: Johnny Farnham
FEMALE VOCAL: Julie Anthony
JOHNNY O'KEEFE ENCOURAGEMENT AWARD: Keith Scott
ENTERTAINER OF THE YEAR: Julie Anthony

1979: 4th Mo Awards
The fourth MO Awards took place on 13 February 1980 at Revesby Workers Club. It was compered by Barry Crocker.

ACCOMPANYING BAND (5 OR LESS): Bob Taylor Quintet & Jack Thorpe's Showband (tie)
ACCOMPANYING BAND (6 OR MORE): Sounds United
RESIDENT or CASUAL BALLET: Diane Heaton Dancers
CLUB PROVIDING BEST FACILITIES & SUPPORTING LOCAL ENTERTAINMENT: Epping RSL Club
COUNTRY SHOWGROUP: Men of Country
COUNTRY MALE ENTERTAINER: Johnny Ashcroft
COUNTRY FEMALE ENTERTAINER: Allison Durbin
VARIETY PRODUCTION SHOW: Simone and Monique's Playgirls Revue
VOCAL GROUP: The Flanagans
INSTRUMENTAL/VOCAL SHOWGROUP: The Fugitives
INSTRUMENTALIST: Mal Cunningham
SPECIALITY ACT: Steve Bor
VERSATILE VARIETY ACT: Carter Edwards
COMEDY ACT (2 OR MORE): The Rhythmaires
COMEDIAN/COMEDIENNE: Brian Doyle
MALE VOCAL: John Farnham
FEMALE VOCAL: Kirri Adams
JOHN CAMPBELL FELLOWSHIP AWARD: Jack Griffiths
DAILY TELEGRAPH READERS AWARD: Don Lane
JOHNNY O'KEEFE ENCOURAGEMENT AWARD: Family Affair
ENTERTAINER OF THE YEAR: Ricky May

5th Mo Awards
Technically, there was no 5th awards. Following the 1979 awards in 1980, the organisation updated the numbering to reflect the 1975 Star Awards were the 1st, thus renumbering following ceremonies.

1980: 6th Mo Awards
The sixth MO Awards took place on 23 February 1981 at Regent Theatre (Sydney). It was compered by Barry Crocker.

ACCOMPANYING BAND (5 OR LESS): Bob Taylor Quintet
ACCOMPANYING BAND (6 OR MORE): Sound Unlimited
RESIDENT or CASUAL BALLET: Diane Heaton Dancers (Epping RSL Club Troupe)
RESIDENT COMPERE: Jeff Parker
CLUB OF THE YEAR: Rooty Hill RSL Club
COUNTRY GROUP: Roadapple
COUNTRY MALE: Greg Anderson
COUNTRY FEMALE: Allison Durbin
VARIETY PRODUCTION SHOW: Toppano Family Show
SHOWGROUP: The Fugitives
VOCAL GROUP: Family Affair
VOCAL DUO: Bill and Boyd
INSTRUMENTALIST (SOLO or DUO): Mal Cunningham
VOCAL/INSTRUMENTAL (SOLO or DUO): Greg Bonham
SPECIALTY ACT: Steve Bor
VERSATILE VARIETY ACT: Ross and Robyn
COMEDY ACT (2 OR MORE): The Rhythmaires
COMEDIAN/COMEDIENNE: Brian Doyle
MALE VOCAL: John Farnham
FEMALE VOCAL: Julie Anthony
JOHN CAMPBELL FELLOWSHIP AWARD: Col Joye
DAILY TELEGRAPH READERS AWARD: Don Lane
JOHNNY O'KEEFE ENCOURAGEMENT AWARD: Simon Gallaher
ENTERTAINER OF THE YEAR: John Farnham

1981: 7th Mo Awards
The seventh MO Awards took place on 17 March 1982 at Bankstown Town Hall. It was compered by Toni Stevens & Steve Raymond

ACCOMPANYING BAND (5 OR LESS): Dave Bridge Band
ACCOMPANYING BAND (6 0R MORE): Norm Faber Orchestra
RESIDENT or CASUAL BALLET: Diane Heaton Dancers
RESIDENT COMPERE: Rickie Hilder
CLUB OF THE YEAR: Rooty Hill RSL Club
COUNTRY GROUP: Men Of Country
COUNTRY MALE: Greg Anderson
COUNTRY FEMALE: Judy Stone
VARIETY PRODUCTION SHOW: Simone and Monique's Playgirls Revue
VOCAL GROUP: The Four Kinsmen
VOCAL DUO: Bill and Boyd
INSTRUMENTAL/VOCAL SHOWGROUP: Daly Wilson Big Band
INSTRUMENTALIST (SOLO or DUO): Peta Lowe
VOCAL/INSTRUMENTAL (SOLO or DUO): Simon Gallaher
SPECIALITY ACT: Steve Bor
VERSATILE VARIETY: Carter Edwards
COMEDY ACT (2 OR MORE): The Rhythmaires
COMEDIAN/COMEDIENNE: Johnny Garfield
MALE VOCAL: John Farnham
FEMALE VOCAL: Lynn Rogers
JOHN CAMPBELL FELLOWSHIP AWARD: Jenny Howard
DAILY TELEGRAPH READERS AWARD: Don Lane
JOHNNY O'KEEFE ENCOURAGEMENT AWARD: Jackie Love
ENTERTAINER OF THE YEAR: Barry Crocker

1982: 8th Mo Awards
The eighth MO Awards took place on 16 March 1983 at Regent Theatre (Sydney). It was compered by Barry Crocker

ACCOMPANYING BAND (5 OR LESS): Dave Bridge Band
ACCOMPANYING BAND (6 0R MORE): Impax
RESIDENT or CASUAL BALLET: Diane Heaton Dancers
RESIDENT COMPERE: Jeff Parker
VENUE OF THE YEAR: Bankstown Sports Club
COUNTRY SHOWGROUP: Buckskin
COUNTRY MALE: Digby Richards
COUNTRY FEMALE: Judy Stone
VARIETY PRODUCTION SHOW: Jan Adele and Lucky Grills – Fun Follies
SHOWGROUP: Daly Wilson Big Band
VOCAL GROUP: The Delltones
VOCAL DUO: Bill and Boyd
INSTRUMENTALIST (SOLO or DUO): Peta Lowe
VOCAL/INSTRUMENTAL ACT: Simon Gallaher
SPECIALITY ACT: Steve Bor
VERSATILE VARIETY ACT: Marty Morton
COMEDY ACT (2 OR MORE): The Rhythmaires
COMEDAN/COMEDIENNE: Paul Martell
MALE VOCAL: John Farnham
FEMALE VOCAL: Julie Anthony
JOHN CAMPBELL FELLOWSHIP AWARD: Dorothy Barry
DAILY TELEGRAPH READERS AWARD: Kamahl
JOHNNY O'KEEFE ENCOURAGEMENT AWARD: Karen Beckett
ENTERTAINER OF THE YEAR: Julie Anthony

1983: 9th Mo Awards
The ninth MO Awards took place on 21 March 1984 at Sydney Town Hall.

ACCOMPANYING BAND (5 OR LESS): Bob Taylor Quintet
ACCOMPANYING BAND (6 OR MORE): Impax
RESIDENT or CASUAL BALLET: Diane Heaton Dancers
RESIDENT COMPERE: Rickie Hilder
VENUE OF THE YEAR: Rooty Hill RSL Club
COUNTRY SHOWGROUP: The Bushwackers
COUNTRY MALE: Greg Anderson
COUNTRY FEMALE: Judy Stone
PRODUCTION SHOW: Eddie Youngblood's "Golden Years of Elvis"
VOCAL GROUP: The Delltones
VOCAL DUO: Bill and Boyd
INSTRUMENTAL/VOCAL SHOWGROUP: Wickety Wak Showband
INSTRUMENTALIST (SOLO OR DUO): Peta Lowe
SPECIALITY ACT: Ken Littlewood and Toshi
VOCAL/INSTRUMENTAL ACT: Mary Schneider
VERSATILE VARIETY: Marty Morton
COMEDY ACT (2 OR MORE): Thomas and Moore
COMEDIAN/COMEDIENNE: Paul Martell
MALE VOCAL: Tony Pantano
FEMALE VOCAL: Jackie Love
INTERNATIONAL ACT OF THE YEAR: Peter Allen
JOHN CAMPBELL FELLOWSHIP AWARD: Buster Noble
DAILY TELEGRAPH READERS AWARD: Kamahl
JOHNNY O'KEEFE ENCOURAGEMENT AWARD: Jenny Andrews & Tina Cross (tie)
ENTERTAINER OF THE YEAR: Jon English

1984: 10th Mo Awards
The tenth MO Awards took place on 1 May 1985 at the Sydney Opera House.

ACCOMPANYING BAND (5 OR LESS): Dave Bridge Band
ACCOMPANYING BAND (6 OR MORE): Impax - Fairfield RSL Club
RESIDENT or CASUAL BALLET: Diane Heaton Dancers
RESIDENT COMPERE: Jeff Parker
VENUE OF THE YEAR: Seagulls Rugby League Football Club
COUNTRY SHOWGROUP: Redgum
MALE COUNTRY ENTERTAINER: Wayne Horsburgh
FEMALE COUNTRY ENTERTAINER: Judy Stone
PRODUCTION SHOW: Eddie Youngblood's "Golden Years of Elvis"
INSTRUMENTAL/VOCAL SHOWGROUP: Wickety Wak Showband
VOCAL GROUP (3 OR MORE): The Ritz Company
VOCAL DUO: Bill and Boyd
INSTRUMENTALIST: Martin Lass
VOCAL/INSTRUMENTAL ACT: Mary Schneider
SPECIALITY ACT: Ken Littlewood and Toshi
VERSATILE VARIETY ACT: David Gilchrist
COMEDY ACT (2 OR MORE): Gallagher and Brown
COMEDIAN/COMEDIENNE: Paul Martell
SPECIAL CONTRIBUTION AWARDS: Paul Flanagan & Robyn Selwyn
MALE VOCAL ENTERTAINER: Tony Pantano
FEMALE VOCAL ENTERTAINER: Lynn Rogers
INTERNATIONAL ACT OF THE YEAR: Peter Allen
JOHN CAMPBELL FELLOWSHIP AWARD: Tommy Tycho
DAILY TELEGRAPH READERS AWARD: Kamahl
JOHNNY O'KEEFE ENCOURAGEMENT AWARD: Donna Lee
ENTERTAINER OF THE YEAR: Jon English

1985: 11th Mo Awards
The eleventh MO Awards took place on 30 April 1986 at the South Sydney Junior Leagues Club. The show was directed by Ian Tasker.

ACCOMPANYING BAND (4 OR LESS): Trojans
ACCOMPANYING BAND (5 OR MORE): Impax - Fairfield RSL Club
RESIDENT or CASUAL BALLET: Michelle Day Dancers
RESIDENT COMPERE: Rickie Hilder
VENUE OF THE YEAR: Rooty Hill RSL Club
COUNTRY SHOWGROUP: Grand Junction
MALE COUNTRY ENTERTAINER: Slim Dusty
FEMALE COUNTRY ENTERTAINER: Judy Stone
PRODUCTION SHOW: The Fifty's
ROCK GROUP: Little River Band
SHOWGROUP: The Delltones
VOCAL GROUP (2 OR MORE): The Four Kinsmen
INSTRUMENTALIST: Martin Lass
VOCAL/INSTRUMENTAL ACT: Mary Schneider
SPECIALITY ACT: Max Gillies
VERSATILE VARIETY ACT: Donna Lee
COMEDY ACT: Rodney Rude
MALE VOCAL ENTERTAINER: Jon English
FEMALE VOCAL ENTERTAINER: Debbie Byrne
JOHN CAMPBELL FELLOWSHIP AWARD: Billy Kearns
JOHNNY O'KEEFE ENCOURAGEMENT AWARD: Rikki Organ
ENTERTAINER OF THE YEAR: Jon English

1986: 12th Mo Awards
The twelfth MO Awards took place on 25 March 1987 at Bankstown Sports Club. The show was directed by Bruce Henries.

ACCOMPANYING BAND (4 OR LESS): Trojans
ACCOMPANYING BAND (5 OR MORE): Woomera – Mt Pritchard Community Club
RESIDENT or CASUAL BALLET: Dianne Heaton Dancers
RESIDENT COMPERE: Rickie Hilder
VENUE OF THE YEAR: Petersham RSL Club
COUNTRY SHOWGROUP: The Bushwackers
MALE COUNTRY ENTERTAINER: John Williamson
FEMALE COUNTRY ENTERTAINER: Judy Stone
ROCK GROUP: INXS
PRODUCTION SHOW: The Fifty's
SHOWGROUP: Wickety Wak
VOCAL GROUP (2 OR MORE): The Four Kinsmen
INSTRUMENTALIST: Martin Lass
VOCAL/INSTRUMENTAL ACT: Mary Schneider
SPECIALITY ACT: Marty Coffee
VERSATILE VARIETY ACT: Marty Morton
COMEDY ACT: Paul Martell
DAILY TELEGRAPH READERS AWARD – GROUP: The Four Kinsmen
DAILY TELEGRAPH READERS AWARD – FEMALE: Jackie Love
DAILY TELEGRAPH READERS AWARD – MALE: John Farnham
MALE VOCAL ENTERTAINER: Tony Pantano
FEMALE VOCAL ENTERTAINER: Jackie Love & Julie Anthony
JOHNNY O'KEEFE ENCOURAGEMENT AWARD: Danielle Gaha
ENTERTAINER OF THE YEAR: John Farnham

1987: 13th Mo Awards
The thirteenth MO Awards took place on 13 April 1988 at Rooty Hill RSL Club.

ACCOMPANYING BAND (4 OR LESS): Trojans
ACCOMPANYING BAND (5 OR MORE): Woomera – Mt Pritchard Community Club
RESIDENT or CASUAL BALLET: Dianne Heaton Dancers
RESIDENT COMPERE: Rickie Hilder
VENUE OF THE YEAR: Petersham RSL Club
COUNTRY SHOWGROUP: Redgum
MALE COUNTRY ENTERTAINER: John Williamson
FEMALE COUNTRY ENTERTAINER: Judy Stone
ROCK GROUP: Icehouse
PRODUCTION SHOW: The Fifty's
VOCAL GROUP (2 OR MORE): The Four Kinsmen
INSTRUMENTALIST: Martin Lass
VOCAL/INSTRUMENTAL ACT: Mary Schneider
SPECIALITY ACT: Ken Littlewood & Toshi
MOST OUTSTANDING VARIETY ACT: Wickety Wak
VERSATILE VARIETY ACT: Mark Loyd with Pleasure
COMEDY ACT: Brian Doyle
DAILY TELEGRAPH READERS AWARD – GROUP: Sophisticated Country
DAILY TELEGRAPH READERS AWARD – FEMALE: Jane Scali
DAILY TELEGRAPH READERS AWARD – MALE: John Farnham
MALE VOCAL ENTERTAINER: John Farnham
FEMALE VOCAL ENTERTAINER: Jackie Love
JOHN CAMPBELL FELLOWSHIP AWARD: Doug Burgess
JOHNNY O'KEEFE ENCOURAGEMENT AWARD: Syd Heylen Jnr
ENTERTAINER OF THE YEAR: John Farnham

1988: 14th Mo Awards
The fourteenth MO Awards took place on 22 February 1989 at AJC Royal Randwick. It was compered by Kerri-Anne Kennerley.

ACCOMPANYING BAND: Trojans
CHOREOGRAPHER OF THE YEAR: Ross Coleman
VENUE OF THE YEAR: Petersham RSL Club
COUNTRY SHOWGROUP: The Bushwackers
MALE COUNTRY ENTERTAINER: John Williamson
FEMALE COUNTRY ENTERTAINER: Judy Stone
ROCK GROUP: INXS
MUSICAL THEATRE PERFORMER FEMALE: Geraldine Turner and Debbie Byrne (tie)
MUSICAL THEATRE PERFORMER MALE: Phillip Quast
JAZZ PERFORMER OF THE YEAR: James Morrison
PRODUCTION SHOW: The Fifty's
VOCAL GROUP (2 OR MORE): The Rhythmaires
BEST GROUP: The Four Kinsmen
INSTRUMENTALIST/VOCAL/INSTRUMENTAL ACT: Martin Lass
SPECIALITY ACT: The Allisons (Rick & Debbie)
VERSATILE VARIETY ACT: David Gilchrist and Mark Loyd with Pleasure
COMEDY ACT: Thomas & Moore
DAILY TELEGRAPH READERS AWARD – GROUP: Sophisticated Country
DAILY TELEGRAPH READERS AWARD – FEMALE: Julie Anthony
DAILY TELEGRAPH READERS AWARD – MALE: John Farnham
MALE VOCAL ENTERTAINER: John Farnham
FEMALE VOCAL ENTERTAINER: Julie Anthony
MOST OUTSTANDING CLUB ACT: Col Joye
AUSTRALIAN SHOWBUSINESS AMBASSADOR – Paul Hogan
JOHN CAMPBELL FELLOWSHIP AWARD: Ricky May
JOHNNY O'KEEFE ENCOURAGEMENT AWARD: Tête à Tête
ENTERTAINER OF THE YEAR: Ricky May

1989: 15th Mo Awards
The fifteenth MO Awards took place on 21 February 1990 at AJC Royal Randwick. It was compered by Ray Martin.

ACCOMPANYING BAND: Trojans
COMPERE OF THE YEAR: Norm Erskine
VENUE OF THE YEAR: Blacktown Workers Club
CIRCUS PERFORMER OF THE YEAR: The Flying Fruit Fly Circus
CLASSICAL PERFORMANCE OF THE YEAR: Sydney Symphony Orchestra
CONTEMPORARY CONCERT PERFORMER OF THE YEAR: Kate Ceberano
DANCE PERFORMANCE OF THE YEAR: Sydney Dance Company
OPERATIC PERFORMANCE OF THE YEAR: Robert Gard
FOLK PERFORMER OF THE YEAR:Judy Small
COUNTRY SHOWGROUP: Happening Thang
MALE COUNTRY ENTERTAINER: James Blundell
FEMALE COUNTRY ENTERTAINER: Deniese Morrison
COUNTRY PERFORMER OF THE YEAR: Wayne Horsburgh
ROCK PERFORMER MALE: Paul Kelly
ROCK PERFORMER FEMALE: Kate Ceberano
ROCK GROUP: Paul Kelly and the Messengers
ROCK PERFORMER OF THE YEAR: Kate Ceberano
MUSICAL THEATRE PRODUCTION: 42nd Street
SUPPORTING MUSICAL THEATRE PERFORMER FEMALE: Toni Lamond
SUPPORTING MUSICAL THEATRE PERFORMER MALE: John Bell
MUSICAL THEATRE PERFORMER FEMALE: Debbie Byrne
MUSICAL THEATRE PERFORMER MALE: Cameron Daddo
JAZZ PERFORMER OF THE YEAR MALE: James Morrison
JAZZ PERFORMER OF THE YEAR FEMALE: Kerrie Biddell
JAZZ GROUP: Ten Part Invention
JAZZ PERFORMER OF THE YEAR: James Morrison
CABARET PRODUCTION SHOW: The Fifty's
CABARET DUO/TRIO: Triple Treat
CABARET GROUP: The Four Kinsmen
INSTRUMENTALIST/VOCAL/INSTRUMENTAL ACT: Martin Lass
SPECIALITY ACT: The Allisons
VERSATILE CABARET PERFORMANCE: Mark Loyd with Pleasure
COMEDY GROUP: Wickety Wak
COMEDY PERFORMER MALE: Bobby Dennis
COMEDY PERFORMER FEMALE: Geraldine Doyle
MALE VOCAL CABARET ENTERTAINER: Tony Pantano
FEMALE VOCAL CABARET ENTERTAINER: Jackie Love
CABARET PERFORMER OF THE YEAR: Tony Pantano
AUSTRALIAN SHOWBUSINESS AMBASSADOR: Kylie Minogue
JOHN CAMPBELL FELLOWSHIP AWARD: Maurie Rooklyn
JOHNNY O'KEEFE ENCOURAGEMENT AWARD: Mark Kristian
AUSTRALIAN PERFORMER OF THE YEAR: James Morrison

1990: 16th Mo Awards
The sixteenth MO Awards took place on 17 February 1991 at State Theatre (Sydney). It was compered by Ray Martin, Maggie Kirkpatrick, Brian Doyle and Steve Vizard.

ACCOMPANYING BAND: Trojans
COMPERE OF THE YEAR: Rickie Hilder
VENUE OF THE YEAR: Petersham RSL
CIRCUS PERFORMER OF THE YEAR: Circus Oz
CLASSICAL PERFORMANCE OF THE YEAR: Stuart Challender
CONTEMPORARY CONCERT PERFORMER OF THE YEAR: John Farnham
DANCE PERFORMANCE OF THE YEAR: Sydney Dance Company - King Roger
OPERATIC PERFORMANCE OF THE YEAR: Australian Opera – La boheme
FOLK PERFORMER OF THE YEAR: Eric Bogle
COUNTRY SHOWGROUP: Happening Thang
MALE COUNTRY ENTERTAINER: Wayne Horsburgh
FEMALE COUNTRY ENTERTAINER: Jean Stafford
COUNTRY PERFORMER OF THE YEAR: John Williamson
ROCK PERFORMER MALE: Joe Camilleri
ROCK PERFORMER FEMALE: Wendy Matthews
ROCK GROUP: Midnight Oil
ROCK PERFORMER OF THE YEAR: Midnight Oil
MUSICAL THEATRE PRODUCTION: The Phantom of the Opera
SUPPORTING MUSICAL THEATRE PERFORMER FEMALE: Christa Leahman
SUPPORTING MUSICAL THEATRE PERFORMER MALE: Johnathan Biggins
MUSICAL THEATRE PERFORMER FEMALE: Marina Prior
MUSICAL THEATRE PERFORMER MALE: Anthony Warlow
MUSICAL THEATRE PERFORMER OF THE YEAR: Anthony Warlow
JAZZ PERFORMER OF THE YEAR MALE: James Morrison
JAZZ PERFORMER OF THE YEAR FEMALE: Kate Ceberano
JAZZ GROUP: Mike Nock Quartet
JAZZ PERFORMER OF THE YEAR: James Morrison
CABARET PRODUCTION SHOW: Greg Anderson's Electric SpectacularCABARET DUO/TRIO: Mark Loyd With Pleasure
CABARET GROUP: Black Tie
INSTRUMENTAL ACT: Martin Lass
SPECIALITY ACT: Leaping Loonies
VERSATILE CABARET PERFORMANCE: Tony Field and Flame
COMEDY GROUP: Lester and Smart
COMEDY PERFORMER MALE: Brian Doyle
COMEDY PERFORMER FEMALE: Geraldine Doyle
MALE VOCAL CABARET PERFORMER: Tony Pananto
FEMALE VOCAL CABARET PERFORMER: Jane Scali
CABARET PERFORMER OF THE YEAR: Tony Pantano
AUSTRALIAN SHOWBUSINESS AMBASSADOR: Dame Joan Sutherland
JOHN CAMPBELL FELLOWSHIP AWARD: Norman Kermond
JOHNNY O'KEEFE ENCOURAGEMENT AWARD: John Bowles
AUSTRALIAN PERFORMER OF THE YEAR: Dame Joan Sutherland

1991: 17th Mo Awards
The seventeenth MO Awards took place on 4 June 1992 at Sydney Convention and Exhibition Centre. It was compered by Geraldine Doyle, Terry Willesee and Larry Emdur.

1 & 2 MAN BAND: Bill and Boyd
ACCOMPANYING BAND: Trojans
RESIDENT TECHNICAL SUPPORT: Damon Hartley
COMPERE OF THE YEAR: Stephen 'Spud' Murphy
VENUE OF THE YEAR: Petersham RSL
CLASSICAL PERFORMANCE OF THE YEAR: Stuart Challender
DANCE PERFORMANCE OF THE YEAR: Miranda Coney and Greg Horsman
OPERATIC PERFORMANCE OF THE YEAR: Australian Opera - RigolettoFOLK PERFORMER OF THE YEAR: Archie Roach
COUNTRY SHOWGROUP: Happening Thang
MALE COUNTRY ENTERTAINER: John Williamson
FEMALE COUNTRY ENTERTAINER: Anne Kirkpatrick
COUNTRY PERFORMER OF THE YEAR: John Williamson
ROCK PERFORMER OF THE YEAR: Crowded House
MUSICAL THEATRE PRODUCTION: The Phantom of the OperaSUPPORTING MUSICAL THEATRE PERFORMER FEMALE: Maria Mercedes
SUPPORTING MUSICAL THEATRE PERFORMER MALE: William Zappa
MUSICAL THEATRE PERFORMER FEMALE: Judi Connelli
MUSICAL THEATRE PERFORMER MALE: Anthony Warlow
MUSICAL THEATRE PERFORMER OF THE YEAR: Anthony Warlow
OUTSTANDING CONTRIBUTION TO MUSICAL THEATRE: David Atkins
JAZZ PERFORMER OF THE YEAR MALE: Dale Barlow
JAZZ PERFORMER OF THE YEAR FEMALE: Judy Bailey
JAZZ GROUP: Free Spirits
JAZZ PERFORMER OF THE YEAR: Dale Barlow
VARIETY PRODUCTION SHOW: Licensed to ThrillVARIETY DUO/TRIO: Tony Field and Flame
VARIETY GROUP: The Four Kinsmen
INSTRUMENTAL ACT: Wayne King
SPECIALITY ACT: Phil Cass
VERSATILE VARIETY PERFORMANCE: David Gilchrist
COMEDY GROUP: Thomas and Moore
COMEDY PERFORMER MALE: Brian Doyle
COMEDY PERFORMER FEMALE: Geraldine Doyle
COMEDY PERFORMER OF THE YEAR: Paul Martell
MALE VOCAL VARIETY PERFORMER: Tony Pananto
FEMALE VOCAL VARIETY PERFORMER: Jane Scali
VARIETY PERFORMER OF THE YEAR: The Four Kinsmen
AUSTRALIAN SHOWBUSINESS AMBASSADOR: Jason Donovan
JOHN CAMPBELL FELLOWSHIP AWARD: June Evans
MOST SUCCESS ATTRACTION OF THE YEAR: John Williamson
JOHNNY O'KEEFE ENCOURAGEMENT AWARD: Jenni and Michael
AUSTRALIAN PERFORMER OF THE YEAR: Stuart Challender

1992: 18th Mo Awards
The eighteenth MO Awards took place on 9 June 1993 at Sydney Convention and Exhibition Centre. It was compered by David Reyne and Marty Rhone.

1 & 2 MAN BAND: Take Two
ACCOMPANYING BAND: Trojans
RESIDENT TECHNICAL SUPPORT: Damon Hartley
COMPERE OF THE YEAR: Frank Garaty
VENUE OF THE YEAR: Petersham RSL
CLASSICAL PERFORMANCE OF THE YEAR: Richard Tognetti
DANCE PERFORMANCE OF THE YEAR: Paul Mercurio
OPERATIC PERFORMANCE OF THE YEAR: Suzanne Johnston
FOLK PERFORMER OF THE YEAR: Archie Roach
COUNTRY GROUP: The Fargone Beauties
MALE COUNTRY ENTERTAINER: Lee Kernaghan
FEMALE COUNTRY ENTERTAINER: Anne Kirkpatrick
COUNTRY PERFORMER OF THE YEAR: Lee Kernaghan
ROCK PERFORMER OF THE YEAR: Yothu Yindi
MUSICAL THEATRE PRODUCTION: The Phantom of the OperaSUPPORTING MUSICAL THEATRE PERFORMER FEMALE: Nancye Hayes
SUPPORTING MUSICAL THEATRE PERFORMER MALE: Peter Carroll
MUSICAL THEATRE PERFORMER FEMALE: Delia Hannah
MUSICAL THEATRE PERFORMER MALE: David Atkins
MUSICAL THEATRE PERFORMER OF THE YEAR: David Atkins
OUTSTANDING CONTRIBUTION TO MUSICAL THEATRE: Gale Edwards
JAZZ PERFORMER OF THE YEAR MALE: Dale Barlow
JAZZ PERFORMER OF THE YEAR FEMALE: Sandy Evans
JAZZ GROUP: Bernie McGann Trio
JAZZ PERFORMER OF THE YEAR: Bob Barnard
VARIETY PRODUCTION SHOW: Licensed to ThrillVARIETY DUO/TRIO: Mark Loyd With Pleasure
VARIETY GROUP: The Four Kinsmen
INSTRUMENTAL ACT: James Edward
SPECIALITY ACT: Phil Cass
VERSATILE VARIETY PERFORMANCE: Peter Kaye
COMEDY GROUP: Thomas and Moore
COMEDY PERFORMER MALE: Paul Martell
COMEDY PERFORMER FEMALE: Wendy Harmer
COMEDY PERFORMER OF THE YEAR: Paul Martell
MALE VOCAL VARIETY PERFORMER: Tony Pananto
FEMALE VOCAL VARIETY PERFORMER: Jane Scali
VARIETY PERFORMER OF THE YEAR: The Four Kinsmen
AUSTRALIAN SHOWBUSINESS AMBASSADOR: Yothu Yindi
JOHN CAMPBELL FELLOWSHIP AWARD: Don Burrows
MOST SUCCESS ATTRACTION OF THE YEAR: John Williamson
JOHNNY O'KEEFE ENCOURAGEMENT AWARD: The 4 Trax
AUSTRALIAN PERFORMER OF THE YEAR: Yothu Yindi

1993: 19th Mo Awards
The nineteenth MO Awards took place on 14 June 1994 at Her Majesty's Theatre, Sydney It was compered by John Mangos.

1 & 2 MAN BAND: Twin Set
ACCOMPANYING BAND: The Lionel Huntington Orchestra
RESIDENT TECHNICAL SUPPORT: John Adams
COMPERE OF THE YEAR: Dee Donovan
VENUE OF THE YEAR: Blacktown Workers Club
CLASSICAL PERFORMANCE OF THE YEAR: Richard Tognetti
DANCE PERFORMANCE OF THE YEAR: Stephen Page
OPERATIC PERFORMANCE OF THE YEAR: David Hobson
FOLK PERFORMER OF THE YEAR: Kev Carmody
COUNTRY GROUP: The Fargone Beauties
MALE COUNTRY ENTERTAINER: Lee Kernaghan
FEMALE COUNTRY ENTERTAINER: Gina Jeffreys
COUNTRY PERFORMER OF THE YEAR: Lee Kernaghan
ROCK PERFORMER OF THE YEAR: Crowded House
MUSICAL THEATRE PRODUCTION: Into The WoodsSUPPORTING MUSICAL THEATRICAL PERFORMER: Sharon Millerchip
MUSICAL THEATRE PERFORMER FEMALE: Judi Connelli
MUSICAL THEATRE PERFORMER MALE: Philip Quast
MUSICAL THEATRE PERFORMER OF THE YEAR: Philip Quast
OUTSTANDING CONTRIBUTION TO MUSICAL THEATRE: Brian Thomson
JAZZ INSTRUMENTAL PERFORMER OF THE YEAR: Dale Barlow
JAZZ VOCAL PERFORMER OF THE YEAR: Kerrie Biddell
JAZZ GROUP: Bobby Gebert Trio
JAZZ PERFORMER OF THE YEAR: Bobby Gebert
VARIETY PRODUCTION SHOW: Licensed to ThrillVARIETY DUO/TRIO: Triple Treat
VARIETY GROUP: The Four Kinsmen
INSTRUMENTAL ACT: Igor Cavdarski
SPECIALITY ACT: Phil Cass
VERSATILE VARIETY PERFORMANCE: Peter Kaye
COMEDY GROUP: The Umbilical Brothers
VARIETY COMEDY PERFORMER: Geraldine Doyle
NEW WAVE COMEDY PERFORMER: Steady Eddy
COMEDY PERFORMER OF THE YEAR: Steady Eddy
MALE VOCAL VARIETY PERFORMER: Wayne Cornell
FEMALE VOCAL VARIETY PERFORMER: Julie Anthony
VARIETY PERFORMER OF THE YEAR: The Four Kinsmen
AUSTRALIAN SHOWBUSINESS AMBASSADOR: Barry Humphries
JOHN CAMPBELL FELLOWSHIP AWARD: Colleen Clifford
JOHNNY O'KEEFE ENCOURAGEMENT AWARD: Igor Cavdarski
AUSTRALIAN PERFORMER OF THE YEAR: Anthony Warlow

1994: 20th Mo Awards
The twentieth MO Awards took place on 28 June 1995 at Regent Hotel, Sydney. It was compered by Alan Jones.

1 & 2 MAN BAND: Twin Set
ACCOMPANYING BAND: The Lionel Huntington Orchestra
RESIDENT TECHNICAL SUPPORT: Toni Venditti
COMPERE OF THE YEAR: Dee Donovan
VENUE OF THE YEAR: Blacktown Workers Club
CLASSICAL PERFORMANCE OF THE YEAR: Richard Tognetti
DANCE PERFORMANCE OF THE YEAR: Steven Heathcote
OPERATIC PERFORMANCE OF THE YEAR: Yvonne Kenny
COUNTRY GROUP: The Fargone Beauties
MALE COUNTRY ENTERTAINER: Lee Kernaghan and Graeme Connors (tie)
FEMALE COUNTRY ENTERTAINER: Gina Jeffreys
ROCK PERFORMER OF THE YEAR: The Cruel Sea
MUSICAL THEATRE PRODUCTION: West Side StorySUPPORTING MUSICAL THEATRICAL PERFORMER: Caroline O'Connor
MUSICAL THEATRE PERFORMER FEMALE: Marina Prior
MUSICAL THEATRE PERFORMER MALE: David Atkins
OUTSTANDING CONTRIBUTION TO MUSICAL THEATRE: Brian Thomson
JAZZ INSTRUMENTAL PERFORMER OF THE YEAR: Bernie McGann
JAZZ VOCAL PERFORMER OF THE YEAR: Marie Wilson
JAZZ GROUP: The Catholics
VARIETY PRODUCTION SHOW: Licensed to ThrillVARIETY DUO/TRIO: The Flanagans
VARIETY GROUP: The 4 Trax
VOCAL/INSTRUMENTAL PERFORMER: Joey Fimmano
INSTRUMENTAL PERFORMER: Ross Maio
SPECIALITY ACT: Richard Scholes
VERSATILE VARIETY PERFORMANCE: Peter Kaye
COMEDY GROUP: The Umbilical Brothers
VARIETY COMEDY PERFORMER: Paul Martell
NEW WAVE COMEDY PERFORMER: Steady Eddy and Vince Sorrenti
MALE VOCAL VARIETY PERFORMER: Wayne Cornell
FEMALE VOCAL VARIETY PERFORMER: Jenifer Green
VARIETY PERFORMER OF THE YEAR: The 4 Trax
AUSTRALIAN SHOWBUSINESS AMBASSADOR: David Atkins
20TH ANNIVERSARY YOUTH ACHIEVEMENT: Lucinda Bryant
JOHN CAMPBELL FELLOWSHIP AWARD: Jack Neary and Geoff Mack
JOHNNY O'KEEFE ENCOURAGEMENT AWARD: Melinda Schneider
 AUSTRALIAN PERFORMER OF THE YEAR: Tommy Emmanuel

1995: 21st Mo Awards
The twenty-first MO Awards took place on 18 June 1996 at the Sydney Entertainment Centre. It was compered by Kerri-Anne Kennerley.

1 & 2 MAN BAND: Brian King and Darren Williams (tie)
ACCOMPANYING BAND: Western Front
RESIDENT TECHNICAL SUPPORT: B Lloyd/J Dwyer/D Williams/P Walker/J Adler
COMPERE OF THE YEAR: Neil Hanson
VENUE OF THE YEAR: Wentworthville Leagues Club
CLASSICAL PERFORMANCE OF THE YEAR: Simone Young
MALE DANCE PERFORMANCE OF THE YEAR: Dein Perry
FEMALE DANCE PERFORMANCE OF THE YEAR: Rosalind Crisp
OPERATIC PERFORMANCE OF THE YEAR: Graham Pushee
COUNTRY GROUP: The Dead Ringer Band
MALE COUNTRY ENTERTAINER: Wayne Horsburgh
FEMALE COUNTRY ENTERTAINER: Felicity Urquhart
ROCK PERFORMER OF THE YEAR: Tina Arena
MUSICAL THEATRE PRODUCTION: Hello DollySUPPORTING MUSICAL THEATRICAL PERFORMER: Bert Newton
MUSICAL THEATRE PERFORMER FEMALE: Jill Perryman
MUSICAL THEATRE PERFORMER MALE: Anthony Warlow
OUTSTANDING CONTRIBUTION TO MUSICAL THEATRE: David Atkins
JAZZ INSTRUMENTAL PERFORMER OF THE YEAR: Sandy Evans
JAZZ VOCAL PERFORMER OF THE YEAR: Kerrie Biddell
JAZZ GROUP: Ten Part Invention
VARIETY PRODUCTION SHOW: Licensed to ThrillVARIETY DUO/TRIO: Triple Treat
VARIETY GROUP: The Four Kinsmen
VOCAL/INSTRUMENTAL PERFORMER: Joey Fimmano
INSTRUMENTAL PERFORMER: Bernard Walz
SPECIALITY ACT: Murray Raine
VERSATILE VARIETY PERFORMANCE: Phil Cass
COMEDY GROUP: The Umbilical Brothers
VARIETY COMEDY PERFORMER: Col Elliott
NEW WAVE COMEDY PERFORMER: Steady Eddy
MALE VOCAL VARIETY PERFORMER: Stephen Fisher-King
FEMALE VOCAL VARIETY PERFORMER: Julie Anthony
VARIETY PERFORMER OF THE YEAR: The Four Kinsmen
AUSTRALIAN SHOWBUSINESS AMBASSADOR: David Atkins
JOHN CAMPBELL FELLOWSHIP AWARD: Angry Anderson
JOHNNY O'KEEFE ENCOURAGEMENT AWARD: Davidia Coombes
AUSTRALIAN PERFORMER OF THE YEAR: Tina Arena

1996: 22nd Mo Awards
The twenty-second MO Awards took place on 18 June 1997 at the Sydney Entertainment Centre. It was compered by Susie Elelman.

1 & 2 MAN BAND: Darren Williams
ACCOMPANYING BAND: Ron Hearne Band
RESIDENT TECHNICAL SUPPORT: Toni Venditti
COMPERE OF THE YEAR: Mark Kristian
VENUE OF THE YEAR: Petersham RSL Club
CLASSICAL PERFORMANCE OF THE YEAR: Michael Kieran Harvey
MALE DANCE PERFORMANCE OF THE YEAR: Dein Perry
FEMALE DANCE PERFORMANCE OF THE YEAR: Vicki Attard
OPERATIC PERFORMANCE OF THE YEAR: Elizabeth Whitehouse
COUNTRY GROUP: The Dead Ringer Band
MALE COUNTRY ENTERTAINER: Graeme Connors
FEMALE COUNTRY ENTERTAINER: Gina Jeffreys
ROCK PERFORMER OF THE YEAR: You Am I
MUSICAL THEATRE PRODUCTION: Beauty and the BeastSUPPORTING MUSICAL THEATRICAL PERFORMER: Caroline O'Connor
MUSICAL THEATRE PERFORMER FEMALE: Sharon Millerchip
MUSICAL THEATRE PERFORMER MALE: Hugh Jackman and Michael Cormick (Tie)
OUTSTANDING CONTRIBUTION TO MUSICAL THEATRE: Greg Crease
JAZZ INSTRUMENTAL PERFORMER OF THE YEAR: Bob Barnard
JAZZ VOCAL PERFORMER OF THE YEAR: Vince Jones
JAZZ GROUP: Directions In Groove
VARIETY PRODUCTION SHOW: Licensed to ThrillVARIETY DUO/TRIO: Andrews Sisters Sisters
VARIETY GROUP: The Four Kinsmen
VOCAL/INSTRUMENTAL PERFORMER: Joey Fimmano
INSTRUMENTAL PERFORMER: Bernard Walz
SPECIALITY ACT: Phil Cass
VERSATILE VARIETY PERFORMANCE: Liz Taylor
COMEDY GROUP: The Umbilical Brothers
VARIETY COMEDY PERFORMER: Col Elliott
NEW WAVE COMEDY PERFORMER: Vince Sorrenti
MALE VOCAL VARIETY PERFORMER: Stephen Fisher-King
FEMALE VOCAL VARIETY PERFORMER: Jane Scali
VARIETY PERFORMER OF THE YEAR: Stephen Fisher King
AUSTRALIAN SHOWBUSINESS AMBASSADOR: David Helfgott
JOHN CAMPBELL FELLOWSHIP AWARD: Jimmy Little
JOHNNY O'KEEFE ENCOURAGEMENT AWARD: David Harris
AUSTRALIAN PERFORMER OF THE YEAR: Tommy Emmanuel

1997: 23rd Mo Awards
The twenty-third MO Awards took place on 23 June 1998 at the Sydney Entertainment Centre. It was compered by Don Lane.

1 & 2 MAN BAND: Darren Williams
ACCOMPANYING BAND: Lionel Huntington Orchestra
RESIDENT TECHNICAL SUPPORT: K Lennis, M Pepper, G Harbour
COMPERE OF THE YEAR: Mark Kristian
VENUE OF THE YEAR: Canterbury-Hurlstone Park RSL Club
CLASSICAL PERFORMANCE OF THE YEAR: Michael Keiran Harvey
MALE DANCE PERFORMANCE OF THE YEAR: Dein Perry
FEMALE DANCE PERFORMANCE OF THE YEAR: Lisa Bolte
OPERATIC PERFORMANCE OF THE YEAR: Cheryl Barker
COUNTRY GROUP: The Dead Ringer Band
MALE COUNTRY ENTERTAINER: Troy Cassar-Daley
FEMALE COUNTRY ENTERTAINER: Felicity
ROCK PERFORMER OF THE YEAR: The Whitlams
MUSICAL THEATRE PRODUCTION: CabaretSUPPORTING MUSICAL THEATRICAL PERFORMER: David Campbell
MUSICAL THEATRE PERFORMER FEMALE: Kelley Abbey
MUSICAL THEATRE PERFORMER MALE: Hugh Jackman
OUTSTANDING CONTRIBUTION TO MUSICAL THEATRE: David Atkins
JAZZ INSTRUMENTAL PERFORMER OF THE YEAR: James Morrison
JAZZ VOCAL PERFORMER OF THE YEAR: Shelley Scown
JAZZ GROUP: Bernie McGann Trio
VARIETY PRODUCTION SHOW: Ladies, Laughs and LarrikinsVARIETY DUO/TRIO: Triple Treat
VARIETY GROUP: The Four Kinsmen
VOCAL/INSTRUMENTAL PERFORMER: Shelly White
INSTRUMENTAL PERFORMER: Bernard Walz
SPECIALITY ACT: Phil Cass
VERSATILE VARIETY PERFORMANCE: Maggie Scott
COMEDY GROUP: The Umbilical Brothers
VARIETY COMEDY PERFORMER: Brian Doyle
NEW WAVE COMEDY PERFORMER: Nick Giannopoulos
MALE VOCAL VARIETY PERFORMER: Stephen Fisher-King
FEMALE VOCAL VARIETY PERFORMER: Jane Scali
VARIETY PERFORMER OF THE YEAR: Stephen Fisher King
AUSTRALIAN SHOWBUSINESS AMBASSADOR: Tap Dogs
JOHN CAMPBELL FELLOWSHIP AWARD: Toni Stevens
JOHNNY O'KEEFE ENCOURAGEMENT AWARD: Nathan Foley
AUSTRALIAN PERFORMER OF THE YEAR: Human Nature

1998: 24th Mo Awards
The twenty-fourth MO Awards took place on 22 June 1999 at the Sydney Entertainment Centre. It was compered by Neil Hanson, Liz Taylor and Chris De Havilland.

1 & 2 MAN BAND: Talisman
ACCOMPANYING BAND: Marconi Dance Band
RESIDENT TECHNICAL SUPPORT: Miles Harris
COMPERE OF THE YEAR: Billy Roy
VENUE OF THE YEAR: Panthers World of Entertainment
CLASSICAL PERFORMANCE: Michael Keiran Harvey & Bernadette Balkus (tie)
MALE DANCE PERFORMANCE OF THE YEAR: Gideon Orbarzanek
FEMALE DANCE PERFORMANCE OF THE YEAR: Kate Champion
OPERATIC PERFORMANCE OF THE YEAR: John Wegner
COUNTRY GROUP: The Dead Ringer Band
MALE COUNTRY ENTERTAINER: Troy Cassar-Daley
FEMALE COUNTRY ENTERTAINER: Gina Jeffreys
ROCK PERFORMER OF THE YEAR: Natalie Imbruglia
MUSICAL THEATRE PRODUCTION: The Boy from OzSUPPORTING MUSICAL THEATRICAL PERFORMER: Pamela Rabe
MUSICAL THEATRE PERFORMER FEMALE: Caroline O'Connor
MUSICAL THEATRE PERFORMER MALE: Todd McKenney
OUTSTANDING CONTRIBUTION TO MUSICAL THEATRE: David Atkins
JAZZ INSTRUMENTAL PERFORMER OF THE YEAR: Kevin Hunt
JAZZ VOCAL PERFORMER OF THE YEAR: Marie Wilson
JAZZ GROUP: Trevor Griffin Sextet
VARIETY PRODUCTION SHOW: Ladies, Laughs and LarrikinsVARIETY DUO/TRIO: Aubrey and Martin
VARIETY GROUP: The Four Kinsmen
VOCAL/INSTRUMENTAL PERFORMER: Danny Elliott
INSTRUMENTAL PERFORMER: Ian Cooper
SPECIALITY ACT: Phil Cass
VERSATILE VARIETY PERFORMANCE: Maggie Scott
COMEDY GROUP: Thomas and Moore
VARIETY COMEDY PERFORMER: Kenny Graham
NEW WAVE COMEDY PERFORMER: Vince Sorrenti
MALE VOCAL VARIETY PERFORMER: Stephen Fisher-King
FEMALE VOCAL VARIETY PERFORMER: Jane Scali
VARIETY PERFORMER OF THE YEAR: Maggie Scott
AUSTRALIAN SHOWBUSINESS AMBASSADOR: Natalie Imbruglia
ARENA PERFORMER OF THE YEAR: Anthony Warlow
JOHN CAMPBELL FELLOWSHIP AWARD: John Laws
JOHNNY O'KEEFE ENCOURAGEMENT AWARD: Adam Brand and Tim Draxl (Tie)
AUSTRALIAN PERFORMER OF THE YEAR: The Main Event (Anthony Warlow, John Farnham and Olivia Newton-John)

1999: 25th Mo Awards
The twenty-fifth MO Awards took place on 20 June 2000 at the Sydney Entertainment Centre. It was compered by Don Lane.

1 & 2 MAN BAND: Twin Set
ACCOMPANYING BAND: Patchwork
RESIDENT TECHNICAL SUPPORT: John Adams
COMPERE OF THE YEAR: Mark Kristian
VENUE OF THE YEAR: Canterbury Hurlstone Park RSL Club
CLASSICAL PERFORMER OF THE YEAR: Michael Kieran Harvey
MALE DANCE PERFORMER/CHOREOGRAPHER OF YEAR: Graeme Murphy
FEMALE DANCE PERFORMER/CHOREOGRAPHER OF YEAR: Kelley Abbey
OPERATIC PERFORMANCE OF THE YEAR: Peter Coleman-Wright
COUNTRY GROUP: The Dead Ringer Band
MALE COUNTRY ENTERTAINER: Troy Cassar-Daley
FEMALE COUNTRY ENTERTAINER: Kasey Chambers
ROCK PERFORMER OF THE YEAR: Powderfinger
MUSICAL THEATRE PRODUCTION: The Boy from OzSUPPORTING MUSICAL THEATRICAL PERFORMER: Angela Toohey
MUSICAL THEATRE PERFORMER FEMALE: Caroline O'Connor
MUSICAL THEATRE PERFORMER MALE: Todd McKenney
OUTSTANDING CONTRIBUTION TO MUSICAL THEATRE: Gale Edwards
JAZZ INSTRUMENTAL PERFORMER OF THE YEAR: James Morrison
JAZZ VOCAL PERFORMER OF THE YEAR: Shelly Scown
JAZZ GROUP: Ten Part Invention
VARIETY PRODUCTION SHOW: Ladies, Laughs and LarrikinsVARIETY DUO/TRIO: Aubrey and Martin
VARIETY GROUP: The Zips
VOCAL/INSTRUMENTAL PERFORMER: Danny Elliott
INSTRUMENTAL PERFORMER: Ian Cooper
SPECIALITY ACT: Murray Raine Puppets
VERSATILE VARIETY PERFORMANCE: Maggie Scott
COMEDY GROUP: The Scared Weird Little Guys
VARIETY COMEDY PERFORMER: Kenny Graham
NEW WAVE COMEDY PERFORMER: Nick Giannopoulos
MALE VOCAL VARIETY PERFORMER: Stephen Fisher-King
FEMALE VOCAL VARIETY PERFORMER: Rhonda Burchmore
VARIETY PERFORMER OF THE YEAR: Maggie Scott
AUSTRALIAN SHOWBUSINESS AMBASSADOR: Savage Garden
ARENA PERFORMER OF THE YEAR: John Farnham
JOHN CAMPBELL FELLOWSHIP AWARD: Daryl Somers
JOHNNY O'KEEFE ENCOURAGEMENT AWARD: String Fever
AUSTRALIAN PERFORMER OF THE YEAR: Savage Garden

2000: 26th Mo Awards
The twenty-sixth MO Awards took place on 9 July 2001 at the Sydney Town Hall. It was compered by Vince Sorrenti.

1 & 2 MAN BAND: Twin Set
ACCOMPANYING BAND: The Marconi Dance Band
RESIDENT TECHNICAL SUPPORT: Shane Newham
COMPERE OF THE YEAR: Mark Kristian
VENUE OF THE YEAR: South Sydney Juniors RLFC
FEMALE ACTOR IN A PLAY: Maggie Kirkpatrick
MALE ACTOR IN A PLAY: Billie Brown
THEATRE PRODUCTION OF THE YEAR: The Secret RoomCLASSICAL/OPERA PERFORMER OF THE YEAR: Diana Doherty
DANCE PERFORMER/CHOREOGRAPHER OF THE YEAR: Miranda Coney
COUNTRY GROUP: Feral Swing Cats
MALE COUNTRY ENTERTAINER: Adam Brand
FEMALE COUNTRY ENTERTAINER: Melinda Schneider
CONTEMPORARY ROCK PERFORMER OF THE YEAR: Powderfinger
CLASSIC ROCK PERFORMER OF THE YEAR: Doug Parkinson
MUSICAL THEATRE PRODUCTION: Shout!
SUPPORTING MUSICAL THEATRICAL PERFORMER: Chrissie Amphlett
MUSICAL THEATRE PERFORMER FEMALE: Caroline O'Connor
MUSICAL THEATRE PERFORMER MALE: David Campbell
JAZZ INSTRUMENTAL PERFORMER OF THE YEAR: James Muller
JAZZ VOCAL PERFORMER OF THE YEAR: Michelle Nicolle
JAZZ GROUP: James Muller Trio
VARIETY PRODUCTION SHOW: Forever DiamondVARIETY DUO/TRIO: The Robertson Brothers
VARIETY GROUP: Phoenix
VOCAL/INSTRUMENTAL PERFORMER: Shelly White
INSTRUMENTAL PERFORMER: Slava Grigoryan
SPECIALITY ACT: Brendan Montana
VERSATILE VARIETY PERFORMANCE: Greg Doolan
COMEDY GROUP: Lano and Woodley
MALE COMEDY PERFORMER OF THE YEAR: Jonathan Biggins
FEMALE COMEDY PERFORMER OF THE YEAR: Gretel Killeen
MALE VOCAL VARIETY PERFORMER: John Bowles
FEMALE VOCAL VARIETY PERFORMER: Annie Frances
VARIETY PERFORMER OF THE YEAR: Annie Frances
AUSTRALIAN SHOWBUSINESS AMBASSADOR: Keith Urban
SPECIAL EVENT OF THE YEAR: 2000 Summer Olympics opening ceremony
JOHN CAMPBELL FELLOWSHIP AWARD: Maria Venuti
JOHNNY O'KEEFE ENCOURAGEMENT AWARD: Nikki Webster
AUSTRALIAN PERFORMER OF THE YEAR: Kylie Minogue

2001: 27th Mo Awards
The twenty-seventh MO Awards took place on 24 June 2002 at the Tumbalong Park Ballroom. It was compered by Liz Taylor and Peter Cousens.

1 & 2 MAN BAND: Take Two
ACCOMPANYING BAND: Lionel Huntington Orchestra
RESIDENT TECHNICAL SUPPORT: Paul Kelleners
COMPERE OF THE YEAR: Neil Hanson
VENUE OF THE YEAR: Canterbury-Hurlstone Park RSL Club
LIVE RADIO PERFORMER OF THE YEAR: John Bleby
FEMALE ACTOR IN A PLAY: Jacki Weaver
MALE ACTOR IN A PLAY: Peter Carroll
THEATRE PRODUCTION OF THE YEAR: CloudstreetCLASSICAL/OPERA PERFORMER OF THE YEAR: Peter Coleman-Wright
DANCE PERFORMER/CHOREOGRAPHER OF THE YEAR: Tracey Carrodus
COUNTRY GROUP: The Wolverines
MALE COUNTRY ENTERTAINER: Adam Brand
FEMALE COUNTRY ENTERTAINER: Kasey Chambers
CONTEMPORARY ROCK PERFORMER OF THE YEAR: Human Nature
CLASSIC ROCK PERFORMER OF THE YEAR: Doug Parkinson
MUSICAL THEATRE PRODUCTION: Sweeney Todd
SUPPORTING MUSICAL THEATRICAL PERFORMER: Jackie Love
MUSICAL THEATRE PERFORMER FEMALE: Judi Connelli
MUSICAL THEATRE PERFORMER MALE: Wayne Scott Kermond
JAZZ INSTRUMENTAL PERFORMER OF THE YEAR: Joe Chindamo
JAZZ VOCAL PERFORMER OF THE YEAR: Marie Wilson
JAZZ GROUP: Sydney All Star Big Band
VARIETY PRODUCTION SHOW: Forever DiamondVARIETY DUO/TRIO: The Robertson Brothers
VARIETY GROUP: The Delltones
VOCAL/INSTRUMENTAL PERFORMER: Shelly White
INSTRUMENTAL PERFORMER: String Fever
SPECIALITY ACT: Darren Carr
VERSATILE VARIETY PERFORMANCE: Peter Kay
COMEDY GROUP: The Umbilical Brothers
MALE COMEDY PERFORMER OF THE YEAR: Paul Martell
FEMALE COMEDY PERFORMER OF THE YEAR: Geraldine Doyle
MALE VOCAL VARIETY PERFORMER: Stephen Fisher-King
FEMALE VOCAL VARIETY PERFORMER: Seamus Earley
VARIETY PERFORMER OF THE YEAR: String Fever
AUSTRALIAN SHOWBUSINESS AMBASSADOR: Kylie Minogue
JOHN CAMPBELL FELLOWSHIP AWARD: Reg Lindsay
JOHNNY O'KEEFE ENCOURAGEMENT AWARD: Lisa Crouch
AUSTRALIAN PERFORMER OF THE YEAR: Kylie Minogue

2002: 28th Mo Awards
The twenty-eighth MO Awards took place on 16 June 2003 at the Sydney Entertainment Centre. It was compered by Frankie J Holden.

1 & 2 PERFORMER BAND: Mike Mathieson
ACCOMPANYING BAND: Patchwork
RESIDENT TECHNICAL SUPPORT: Paul Kelleners - Twin Towns
COMPERE OF THE YEAR: Mark Kristian
VENUE OF THE YEAR: Canterbury-Hurlstone Park RSL Club
LIVE RADIO PERFORMER: Toni Tenaglia (SAFM - Morning)
LIVE RADIO TEAM: The Amanda Blair Team (SAFM Adelaide - Breakfast)
FEMALE ACTOR IN A PLAY: Miranda Otto
MALE ACTOR IN A PLAY: Colin Friels
THEATRE PRODUCTION OF THE YEAR: CopenhagenCLASSICAL/OPERA PERFORMER OF THE YEAR: Elizabeth Whitehouse
DANCE PERFORMER/CHOREOGRAPHER OF THE YEAR: Steven Heathcote
COUNTRY GROUP: The Wolverines
MALE COUNTRY ENTERTAINER: Troy Cassar-Daley
FEMALE COUNTRY ENTERTAINER: Melinda Schneider
CONTEMPORARY ROCK PERFORMER OF THE YEAR: Human Nature
CLASSIC ROCK PERFORMER OF THE YEAR: Doug Parkinson
MUSICAL THEATRE PRODUCTION: CabaretSUPPORTING MUSICAL THEATRICAL PERFORMER: Judi Connelli
MUSICAL THEATRE PERFORMER FEMALE: Tamsin Carroll
MUSICAL THEATRE PERFORMER MALE: Toby Allen
JAZZ INSTRUMENTAL PERFORMER OF THE YEAR: James Morrison
JAZZ VOCAL PERFORMER OF THE YEAR: Michelle Nicolle
JAZZ GROUP: Sydney All Star Big Band
VARIETY PRODUCTION SHOW: Forever DiamondVARIETY DUO/TRIO: The Robertson Brothers
VARIETY GROUP: The Zips
VOCAL/INSTRUMENTAL PERFORMER: Shelly White
INSTRUMENTAL PERFORMER: String Fever
SPECIALITY ACT: Brendan Mon Tanner
VERSATILE VARIETY PERFORMANCE: Liz Taylor
COMEDY GROUP: The Umbilical Brothers
MALE COMEDY PERFORMER OF THE YEAR: Paul Martell
FEMALE COMEDY PERFORMER OF THE YEAR: Maggie Scott
MALE VOCAL VARIETY PERFORMER: Darren Williams
FEMALE VOCAL VARIETY PERFORMER: Seamus Earley
VARIETY PERFORMER OF THE YEAR: Darren Williams
AUSTRALIAN SHOWBUSINESS AMBASSADOR: Kylie Minogue
JOHN CAMPBELL FELLOWSHIP AWARD: Reg Lindsay
JOHNNY O'KEEFE ENCOURAGEMENT AWARD: Adam Scicluna
AUSTRALIAN PERFORMER OF THE YEAR: Kylie Minogue

2003: 29th Mo Awards
The twenty-ninth MO Awards took place on 28 June 2004 at the Sydney Entertainment Centre. It was compered by Jean Kittson.

1 & 2 PERFORMER BAND: Take Two
ACCOMPANYING BAND: Patchwork
RESIDENT TECHNICAL SUPPORT: Paul Kelleners & Michael Pepper/ Simon Wade (Tie)
COMPERE OF THE YEAR: Neil Hanson & Mark Kristian (Tie)
VENUE OF THE YEAR: Canterbury-Hurlstone Park RSL Club
FEMALE ACTOR IN A PLAY: Sigrid Thornton
MALE ACTOR IN A PLAY: Marcus Graham
THEATRE PRODUCTION OF THE YEAR: The Blue RoomCLASSICAL/OPERA PERFORMER OF THE YEAR: Emma Matthews
DANCE PERFORMER/CHOREOGRAPHER OF THE YEAR: Bradley Chatfield
COUNTRY GROUP: The Wolverines
MALE COUNTRY ENTERTAINER: Troy Cassar-Daley
FEMALE COUNTRY ENTERTAINER: Melinda Schneider
CONTEMPORARY ROCK PERFORMER OF THE YEAR: Doug Parkinson
CLASSIC ROCK PERFORMER OF THE YEAR: Birtles Shorrock Goble and Jimmy Little (Tie)
MUSICAL THEATRE PRODUCTION: The Lion King
SUPPORTING MUSICAL THEATRICAL PERFORMER: Terry Bader
MUSICAL THEATRE PERFORMER FEMALE: Buyisile Zama
MUSICAL THEATRE PERFORMER MALE: Toby Allen
JAZZ INSTRUMENTAL PERFORMER OF THE YEAR: Joe Chindamo
JAZZ VOCAL PERFORMER OF THE YEAR: Michelle Nicole
JAZZ GROUP: The Sydney All Star Big Band
VARIETY PRODUCTION SHOW: Forever DiamondVARIETY DUO/TRIO: The Robertson Brothers
VARIETY GROUP: The Ten Tenors
VOCAL/INSTRUMENTAL PERFORMER: Shelly White
INSTRUMENTAL PERFORMER: String Fever
SPECIALITY ACT: Darren Carr
VERSATILE VARIETY PERFORMANCE: Greg Doolan
COMEDY GROUP: Thomas and Moore
MALE COMEDY PERFORMER OF THE YEAR: Paul Martell and Calvin De Grey (Tie)
FEMALE COMEDY PERFORMER OF THE YEAR: Geraldine Doyle
MALE VOCAL VARIETY PERFORMER: Stephen Fisher-King
FEMALE VOCAL VARIETY PERFORMER: Lisa Crouch and Seamus Earley (Tie)
VARIETY PERFORMER OF THE YEAR: Lisa Crouch
AUSTRALIAN SHOWBUSINESS AMBASSADOR: Hugh Jackman
JOHNNY O'KEEFE ENCOURAGEMENT AWARD: David Stephens
AUSTRALIAN PERFORMER OF THE YEAR: Delta Goodrem

2004: 30th Mo Awards
The thirtieth MO Awards took place on 28 April 2006 at the Sydney Entertainment Centre. It was presented by Ken Laing, Tommy Tycho and Geoff Harvey.

1 & 2 PERFORMER BAND: Just Jammin'
ACCOMPANYING BAND: Steve Isoardi Band
RESIDENT TECHNICAL SUPPORT: Gabby Venditti
COMPERE OF THE YEAR: Rikki Organ
VENUE OF THE YEAR: Star City Casino
FEMALE ACTOR IN A PLAY: Cate Blanchett
MALE ACTOR IN A PLAY: Garry McDonald
THEATRE PRODUCTION OF THE YEAR: Hedda Gabler
CLASSICAL/OPERA PERFORMER OF THE YEAR: Teddy Tahu Rhodes
DANCE PERFORMER/CHOREOGRAPHER OF THE YEAR: Benjamin Nicholls
COUNTRY GROUP: The Flood
MALE COUNTRY ENTERTAINER: John Stephan
FEMALE COUNTRY ENTERTAINER: Melinda Schneider
CONTEMPORARY ROCK PERFORMER OF THE YEAR: Anthony Callea
CLASSIC ROCK PERFORMER OF THE YEAR: Marcia Hines
MUSICAL THEATRE PRODUCTION: Dirty DancingSUPPORTING MUSICAL THEATRICAL PERFORMER: Tony Sheldon
MUSICAL THEATRE PERFORMER FEMALE: Chloe Dallimore
MUSICAL THEATRE PERFORMER MALE: Reg Livermore
JAZZ INSTRUMENTAL PERFORMER OF THE YEAR: Andy Firth
JAZZ VOCAL PERFORMER OF THE YEAR: Emma Pask
JAZZ GROUP: The Sydney All Star Big Band
CHILDREN'S SHOW: The Wiggles
VARIETY PRODUCTION SHOW: Björn AgainVARIETY DUO/TRIO: Bella
VARIETY GROUP: The Shy Guys
VOCAL/INSTRUMENTAL PERFORMER: Bob Howe
INSTRUMENTAL PERFORMER: Slava Grigorian
SPECIALITY ACT: Darren Carr
VERSATILE VARIETY PERFORMANCE: Todd McKenney
COMEDY GROUP: The Kransky Sisters
MALE COMEDY PERFORMER OF THE YEAR: Gerry Connolly
FEMALE COMEDY PERFORMER OF THE YEAR: Magda Szubanski
MALE VOCAL VARIETY PERFORMER: Adam Scicluna
FEMALE VOCAL VARIETY PERFORMER: Karen Beckett
VARIETY PERFORMER OF THE YEAR: Wayne Scott Kermond
AUSTRALIAN SHOWBUSINESS AMBASSADOR: Hugh Jackman
JOHNNY O'KEEFE ENCOURAGEMENT AWARD: The Baileys
AUSTRALIAN PERFORMER OF THE YEAR: Anthony Warlow

 2005 
There were no awards for 2005.

2006: 31st Mo Awards
The thirtieth-first MO Awards took place on 28 August 2007 at the Bankstown Sports Club. It was presented by Rodney Marks, Darren Carr, Liz Layton, Kenny Graham and Johnny Pace.

THREE OR MORE PERFORMER BAND: The Williams Brothers
COMPERE OF THE YEAR: Rikki Organ
INSTRUMENTAL or VOCAL INSTRUMENTAL PERFORMER: Joey Fimmano
CLASSICAL/OPERA PERFORMER: Helen Zerefos
DANCE PERFORMER: Wayne Scott Kermond
RICKY MAY JAZZ PERFORMER: James Morrison
VARIETY DUO OR TRIO PERFORMER: Triple Treat
RESIDENT TECHNICAL SUPPORT: Blacktown Workers
TWO PERFORMER BAND: Take Two
TRIBUTE SHOW: Tom Jones Experience - Jacques Renay
BRIAN STACEY MUSICAL THEATRE PERFORMER: Tony Sheldon
KEN LITTLEWOOD AND TOSHI SPECIALTY ACT: Darren Carr
ACCOMPANYING BAND: Western Front
BEST VENUE: Blacktown Workers
FEMALE VOCAL PERFORMER: Karen Beckett
ONE PERFORMER BAND: Ziggy Zapata
MALE VOCAL PERFORMER: Tony Pantano
ACTOR IN PLAY: Geoffrey Rush
SHOWBAND: Frogs on Toast and The Zips (Tie)
THE FOUR KINSMEN PRODUCTION SHOW: The Great PretendersROCK PERFORMER: Billy Thorpe (Posthumous Award)
VERSATILE PERFORMER: Darren Carr
COMEDY PERFORMER: Paul Martell
SLIM DUSTY COUNTRY PERFORMER: Melinda Schneider
PETER ALLEN VARIETY PERFORMER: Danny Elliott
JOHNNY O'KEEFE ENCOURAGEMENT AWARD: Nicole Venditti
AUSTRALIAN PERFORMER OF THE YEAR: Hugh Jackman
OUTSTANDING CONTRIBUTION TO AUSTRALIAN COMEDY: Rodney Rude
OUTSTANDING CONTRIBUTION TO AUSTRALIAN MUSIC: Aaron McMillan
JOHN CAMPBELL FELLOWSHIP AWARD: Jonathon Welch
HALL OF FAME: Slim De Grey

2007: 32nd Mo Awards
The thirtieth-second MO Awards took place on 17 June 2008 at the Bankstown Sports Club. It was compered by Donnie Sutherland;.

ONE PERFORMER BAND: Roland Storm
TWO PERFORMER BAND: Williams Brothers
THREE OR MORE PERFORMER BAND: The Williams Brothers
VERSATILE PERFORMER: Darren Carr
RESIDENTIAL TECHNICAL SUPPORT: Blacktown Workers Club
CLASSICAL/OPERA PERFORMER: Anthony Warlow
CHILDREN'S ENTERTAINMENT: Marty & Emu Crazy Kids Show
BRAIN STACEY MALE MUSICAL THEATRE PERFORMER: Wayne Scott Kermond
FEMALE VOCAL PERFORMER: Karen Beckett
SHOWBAND: The Zips
COMPERE OF THE YEAR: Bobby Bradford
BRIAN STACEY FEMALE MUSICAL THEATRE PERFORMER: Lola Nixon
BEST VENUE: Blacktown Workers Club
FOUR KINSMEN PRODUCTION SHOW: Frogs on ToastSLIM DUSTY COUNTRY MALE VOCAL PERFORMER: Wayne Horsburgh
ACCOMPANYING BAND: Western Front
VARIETY DUO OR TRIO: Robertson Bros & The Williams Brothers (Tie)
COUNTRY FEMALE VOCAL PERFORMER: Melinda Schneider
COUNTRY GROUP: The Wolverines
INSTRUMENTAL/ VOCAL PERFORMER: Ziggy Zapata
DANCE PERFORMER: Lucinda Dunn
RICKY MAY MALE VOCAL PERFORMER: Adam Scicluna
KEN LITTLEWOOD & TOSHI SPECIALTY PERFORMER: Darren Carr
INSTRUMENTAL or VOCAL/INSTRUMENTAL PERFORMER: Joey Fimmano
TRIBUTE SHOW: Tom Jones Experience - Jacques Renay
MATS UNDER 18'S JUNIOR PERFORMER OF THE YEAR: Mark Vincent
JOHN CAMPBELL FELLOWSHIP AWARD: Liz Taylor
COMEDY PERFORMER: Kenny Graham
JOHNNY O'KEEFE ENCOURAGEMENT AWARD: Robert Jeffery
OUTSTANDING CONTRIBUTION TO COUNTRY MUSIC: Smoky Dawson
HALL OF FAME AWARD: Judy Stone
PETER ALLEN AUSTRALIAN PERFORMER OF THE YEAR: Darren Carr

2008: 33rd Mo Awards
The thirty-third MO Awards took place on 15 June 2009 at the Bankstown Sports Club. It was compered by Donnie Sutherland.

ONE PERFORMER BAND: Ziggy Zapata
TWO PERFORMER BAND: The Williams Brothers
THREE OR MORE PERFORMER BAND: Rikki Organ and The Organ Grinders
SHOWBAND: Frogs On Toast
INSTRUMENTAL or VOCAL/INSTRUMENTAL PERFORMER: Joey Fimmano
RESIDENT TECHNICAL SUPPORT: Bankstown Sports Club
SLIM DUSTY MALE COUNTRY VOCAL PERFORMER: Troy Cassar-Daly
INTERNATIONAL THEME PERFORMER: Aznavour From Today
TRIBUTE SHOW: Tonite's The NightBRIAN STACEY MALE MUSICAL THEATRE PERFORMER: Wayne Scott Kermond
CHILDREN'S SHOW: Marty and Emu's Crazy Kids Show
COUNTRY GROUP: The McClymonts
MATS UNDER 18'S JUNIOR PERFORMER OF THE YEAR: Blake Giles
VOCAL GROUP: The Robertson Brothers
KEN LITTLEWOOD AND TOSHI SPECIALTY PERFORMER: Darren Carr
FEMALE VOCAL PERFORMER: Lisa Crouch
BEST VENUE: Bankstown Sports Club
JOHNNY O'KEEFE ENCOURAGEMENT AWARD: Mark Vincent
BRIAN STACEY FEMALE MUSICAL THEATRE PERFORMER: Marina Prior
COMPERE OF THE YEAR: Bobby Bradford
VERSATILE PERFORMER: Wayne Scott Kermond
CLASSICAL/OPERA PERFORMER: Anthony Warlow
FEMALE COUNTRY VOCAL PERFORMER: Melinda Schneider
ACCOMPANYING BAND: Western Front
JOHN CAMPBELL FELLOWSHIP AWARD: Helen Zerefos
THE FOUR KINSMEN PRODUCTION SHOW: The Great Pretenders
RICKY MAY MALE VOCAL PERFORMER: Tony Pantano
COMEDY PERFORMER: Paul Martell
VARIETY DUO OR TRIO PERFORMERS: The Rhythmaires
OUTSTANDING CONTRIBUTION TO VARIETY ENTERTAINMENT: Wayne Scott Kermond
PETER ALLEN AUSTRALIAN PERFORMER OF THE YEAR: Darren Carr
HALL OF FAME: Lucky Starr

2009: 34th Mo Awards
The thirty-fourth MO Awards took place on 11 May 2010 at the Bankstown Sports Club. It was compered by Donnie Sutherland.

ONE PERFORMER BAND: Fallon
TWO PERFORMER BAND: Just Jammin'
THREE OR MORE PERFORMER BAND: Rikki Organ and The Organ Grinders
ACCOMPANYING BAND: Vince Lombardo Band
INSTRUMENTAL/ VOCAL INSTRUMENTAL PERFORMER: Bob Howe
SHOWBAND: The Kamis
RESIDENT TECHNICAL SUPPORT: Bankstown Sports Club
BEST VENUE: Bankstown Sports Club and South Sydney Juniors Leagues Club (Tie)
CHILDREN'S SHOW: Brendan Mon Tanner
COMEDIAN OF THE YEAR: Kenny Graham
VOCAL GROUP: The Robertson Brothers
KEN LITTLEWOOD & TOSHI SPECIALTY PERFORMER: Darren Carr
MATS WINNER FOR 2009: Rhian Saunders
TRIBUTE SHOW: Strictly BasseyINTERNATIONAL THEME PERFORMER: Euro Latino
SLIM DUSTY COUNTRY PERFORMER OR BAND: The McClymonts
VARIETY DUO OR TRIO PERFORMER: Thomas & Moore
JOHNNY O'KEEFE ENCOURAGEMENT AWARD: Chris Gable
COMPERE OF THE YEAR: Rikki Organ
THE FOUR KINSMEN PRODUCTION SHOW: Back To The TivoliFEMALE VOCAL PERFORMER: Jenifer Green
RICKY MAY MALE VOCAL PERFORMER: Tony Pantano
ROCK PERFORMER OR BAND: Brian Cadd
JOHN CAMPBELL FELLOWSHIP AWARD: Lorrae Desmond, Lynne Fletcher, Dinah Lee,Little Pattie, Jacqui De Paul, Sylvia Raye
PETER ALLEN AUSTRALIAN PERFORMER OF THE YEAR: Jenifer Green
HALL OF FAME AWARD: Frank Ifield

2010: 35th Mo Awards
The thirty-fifth MO Awards took place on 24 May 2011 at the Bankstown Sports Club. It was compered by Donnie Sutherland, Susie Elelman, John Mangos and Barry Crocker.

SOLO BAND PERFORMER: Chris Connolly
TWO MAN PERFORMER BAND: The Williams Brothers
DANCE BAND: Rikki Organ and the Organ Grinders
SHOWBAND: The Kamis and The Zips (Tie)
TRIBUTE SHOW: Strictly BasseyINTERNATIONAL THEME PERFORMER: Italian Delight
JOHN CAMPBELL FELLOWSHIP AWARD: Marty Rhone
THE FOUR KINSMEN PRODUCTION/PACKAGE SHOW: Back To The TivoliINSTRUMENTAL or VOCAL/INSTRUMENTAL PERFORMER: Bob Howe
JOHNNY O'KEEFE ENCOURAGEMENT AWARD: The Seltic Sirens
BEST SPECIALTY ACT: Darren Carr
VARIETY DUO OR MORE PERFORMERS: Thomas & Moore
COMPERE OF THE YEAR: Rikki Organ 
HALL OF FAME: Ian Turpie
SLIM DUSTY COUNTRY PERFORMER: Nikki Gillis & Kel-Anne Brandt
BEST CHILDREN'S SHOW: Brendan Mon Tanner
ROCK PERFORMER OR BAND: Guy Sebastian
ACCOMPANYING BAND: Trojans and Vince Lombardo Band (Tie)
RESIDENT TECHNICAL SUPPORT: Petersham RSL Club
FEMALE VOCAL PERFORMER: Jenifer Green
BEST VENUE: Bankstown Sports Club and Blacktown Workers Club (Tie)
COMEDIAN OF THE YEAR: Keith Scott
RODNEY RUDE STAND-UP PERFORMER: Vince Sorrenti
RICKI MAY MALE PERFORMER: Adam Scicluna
PETER ALLEN AUSTRALIAN PERFORMER OF THE YEAR: Jenifer Green

2011: 36th Mo Awards
The thirty-sixth MO Awards took place on 29 May 2012 at the Bankstown Sports Club. It was compered by Donnie Sutherland, Susie Elelman, John Mangos and Vince Sorrenti.

BEST SOLO BAND PERFORMER: Chris Connolly
BEST DUO BAND: Mike Mathieson Duo
BEST DANCE BAND: Rikki Organ & The Organ Grinders
BEST VARIETY SHOWBAND: Frogs on Toast
BEST TRIBUTE SHOW: Desperado – The Eagles ShowBEST CHILDREN'S SHOW: Franky Valentyn
BEST SPECIALTY ACT: Darren Carr
BEST VERSATILE VARIETY ACT: The Burlesque Spectacular
BEST INTERNATIONAL THEME SHOW: The Seltic Sirens
MO COMEDY ACT OF THE YEAR: Keith Scott
HALL OF FAME AWARD: Russell Morris
MC / COMPERE OF THE YEAR: Bobby Bradford
BEST STAND UP COMEDY PERFORMER: Vince Sorenti
SLIM DUSTY COUNTRY ACT: Melinda Schneider
JOHNNY O'KEEFE ENCOURAGEMENT AWARD: Betty Dargie and Susan Jon Rose (Tie)
BEST ACCOMPANYING BAND: Joe Macri Band
FOUR KINSMEN PRODUCTION/PACKAGE SHOW: Back To The TivoliBEST TECHNICAL SUPPORT: South Sydney Juniors Rugby League Club
JOHN CAMPBELL FELLOWSHIP AWARD: Ronnie Burns
SPECIAL ACKNOWLEDGEMENT AWARD: The Artistes Answering Centre
SPECIAL ACKNOWLEDGEMENT AWARD: Helmut Fisher - Creator of the 'MO' Statuette
BEST VENUE: South Sydney Juniors Rugby League Club
BEST ROCK BAND OR PERFORMER: Jon English – The Rock ShowRICKY MAY MALE VOCAL PERFORMER: Adam Scicluna
FEMALE VOCAL PERFORMER: Melinda Schneider
PETER ALLEN PERFORMER OF THE YEAR: Adam Scicluna

2012: 37th Mo Awards
The thirty-seventh MO Awards took place on 28 May 2013 at the Bankstown Sports Club. It was compered by Bobby Bradford, Adam Scicluna and Neil Hanson.

BEST SOLO BAND PERFORMER: Chris Conolly
BEST DUO: Williams Brothers
BEST CHILDREN'S SHOW: Franky Valentyn
BEST HARMONY VOCAL GROUP: The Robertson Brothers
JOHNNY O'KEEFE ENCOURAGEMENT AWARD: Liam Burrows
BEST SPECIALTY ACT: Darren Carr 
BEST VERSATILE VARIETY ACT: Danny Elliott
INTERNATIONAL THEME SHOW / PERFORMER: Joey Fimmano
BEST VARIETY SHOWBAND: The Zips
BEST TRIBUTE SHOW: Desperado and Strictly Bassey (Tie)
BEST DANCE BAND: Rikki Organ & The Organ Grinders
SLIM DUSTY COUNTRY ACT OF THE YEAR: Wayne Horsburgh
FOUR KINSMEN VARIETY PRODUCTION SHOW: Back To The TivoliMC / COMPERE OF THE YEAR: Elizabeth Star
RODNEY RUDE STAND UP COMEDIAN OF THE YEAR: Anh Do
BEST ROCK ACT OF THE YEAR: The Jon English Band
JOHN CAMPBELL FELLOWSHIP AWARD: Peter Paki
BEST TECHNICAL SUPPORT: Twin Towns Services Club
BEST VENUE: Twin Town Services Club
MO COMEDY ACT OF THE YEAR: Kenny Graham
TOMMY TYCHO ACCOMPANYING BAND: The Joe Macri Band
HALL OF FAME: Geoff Mack
FEMALE VOCAL PERFORMER OF THE YEAR: Alisa Gray
RICKY MAY MALE VOCAL PERFORMER OF THE YEAR: Tony Pantano
PETER ALLEN PERFORMER OF THE YEAR: Adam Scicluna

2013: 38th Mo Awards
The thirty-eighth MO Awards took place on 27 May 2014 at the Bankstown Sports Club. It was compered by Andrew O'Keefe, John Mangos, Judy Stone and Marcia Hines.

BEST SOLO BAND PERFORMER: Snowy Robson
BEST DUO: Take Two
BEST DANCE/SHOWBAND: The Frocks
TOMMY TYCHO ACCOMPANYING BAND: Funky Do Da's
BEST SPECIALTY ACT: Phil Cass
BEST TRIBUTE SHOW: Roy Orbison RebornBEST VERSATILE VARIETY ACT: Wayne Rogers
JOHNNY O'KEEFE ENCOURAGEMENT AWARD: Anja Nissen and Rachel Fahim (Tie)
FOUR KINSMEN VARIETY PRODUCTION SHOW: Supreme Motown
BEST CHILDREN'S SHOW: Brendan Mon Tanner
BEST VARIETY VOCAL GROUP: Double Exposure
BEST ROCK BAND/PERFORMER: The Radiators
INTERNATIONAL THEME SHOW: Peter Paki and The Rhythms of Polynesia
BEST TECHNICAL SUPPORT: Burwood RSL
DON LANE COMPERE OF THE YEAR: Terry Mac
JOHN CAMPBELL FELLOWSHIP AWARD: Carter Edwards
SLIM DUSTY COUNTRY ACT OF THE YEAR: Benn Gunn
RODNEY RUDE STAND-UP COMEDIAN OF THE YEAR: Al Showman
COMEDY ACT OF THE YEAR: Harriet Littlesmith
BEST VENUE: Campsie RSL
HALL OF FAME AWARD: Barry Crocker
JULIE ANTHONY FEMALE VOCAL PERFORMER OF THE YEAR: Kel-Anne Brandt
RICKY MAY MALE VOCAL PERFORMER OF THE YEAR: Larry Stellar
PETER ALLEN PERFORMER OF THE YEAR: Phil Cass

2014: 39th Mo Awards
The thirty-ninth MO Awards took place on 28 July 2015 at the Canterbury-Hurlstone Park RSL Club. It was compered by Darren Carr, Maria Venuti, Craig Bennet, Helen Zerefos and Vince Sorrenti.

BEST SOLO PERFORMER: Chris Connolly
BEST DUO BAND: Aubrey & Martin and Take Two (Tie)
BEST VARIETY/VOCAL GROUP: Chris Drummond Duo
BEST DANCE SHOWBAND: Mr James Band
BEST TRIBUTE SHOW: Tonite's the Night and Sincerely Elvis (Tie)
JOHNNY O'KEEFE ENCOURAGEMENT AWARD: Brian Lorenz
BEST CHILDREN'S SHOW: Franky Valentyn and The Party Bears (Tie)
BEST SPECIALTY ACT: Darren Carr
BEST VERSATILE VARIETY ACT: Thomas & Moore and Wayne Rogers (Tie)
BEST INTERNATIONAL THEME SHOW: Peter Paki & The Rhythms of Polynesia
FOUR KINSMEN VARIETY PRODUCTION SHOW: Damn Good Diva'sDON LANE COMPERE OF THE YEAR: Tony Hogan 
TOMMY TYCHO ACCOMPANYING BAND: Dave Hallard Band
SLIM DUSTY COUNTRY ACT OF THE YEAR: Melinda Schneider
JOHN CAMPBELL FELLOWSHIP AWARD: Larry Stellar
BEST ROCK ACT OF YEAR: Mental As Anything
BEST VISUAL & AUDIO TECHNICAL SUPPORT: Canterbury-Hurlstone Park RSL
BEST VENUE: Cabra-Vale Diggers
RODNEY RUDE BEST STAND-UP COMEDIAN: Gary Who
MO COMEDY ACT OF THE YEAR: Paul Martell & Darren Carr (Tie)
HALL OF FAME: Reg Lindsay
BEST FEMALE VOCAL PERFORMER OF THE YEAR: Lisa Crouch
RICKY MAY MALE VOCAL PERFORMER OF THE YEAR: Roy Cooper
PETER ALLEN PERFORMER OF THE YEAR: Darren Carr

2015: 40th Mo Awards
The fortieth MO Awards took place on 17 August 2016 at the Canterbury-Hurlstone Park RSL Club. It was compered by Darren Sanders and Darren Carr.

ACCOMPANYING BAND: Greg Hooper Band
COMPERE OF THE YEAR: Terry Kaff
VENUE OF THE YEAR: Hope Estate Hunter Valley
DANCE SHOW BAND: Mr James Band and Pink Cadillac (Tie)
JUNIOR AWARD: Bobby Harrison
JOHNNY O'KEEFE ENCOURAGEMENT AWARD: Sara Mazzurco
CHILDREN SHOW: The Gigalees Crazy Comedy Show
VERSATILE VARIETY OR HARMONY ACT: Toni Stevens
SPECIAL LIFETIME ACHIEVEMENT AWARD: Slim Dusty
TRIBUTE SHOW: Sincerely Elvis
DUO ACT: The Happy Hippies
VARIETY PRODUCTION SHOW: The 3 Gen Show – Warren, Wayne Scott and Alexander (Zan) Kermond
INTERNATIONAL THEME SHOW: Roddy Montez Show
COUNTRY FEMALE ACT OF THE YEAR: Jean Stafford
COUNTRY BAND /GROUP OF THE YEAR: Roadhouse
COUNTRY MALE ACT OF THE YEAR: Chad Morgan and Col Hardy (Tie)
SOLO PERFORMER: Chris Bond
SIGHT ACT OF THE YEAR: HotPot and Aunty Judy
JOHN CAMPBELL FELLOWSHIP AWARD: Johnny Nicol
ROCK ACT OF YEAR: The Radiators
TECHNICAL SUPPORT: Laycock Street Theatre
RODNEY RUDE BEST STAND-UP COMEDIAN: Jackie Loeb
MO COMEDY ACT OF THE YEAR: Harriet Littlesmith
HALL OF FAME: Glenn Shorrock
FEMALE VOCAL PERFORMER OF THE YEAR: Helen Zerefos
MALE VOCAL PERFORMER OF THE YEAR: Roy Cooper
ENTERTAINER OF THE YEAR: The 3 Gen Show

2016: 41st Mo Awards
The forty-first MO Awards took place on 20 March 2018 at the Liverpool Catholic Club. It was compered by John Kerr.

VARIETY ACT OF THE YEAR: Drags to BitchesJUNIOR AWARD: Finnian Johnson
THE MO'S ENCOURAGEMENT AWARDS: Platinum Harmony
CHILDREN'S SHOW AWARDS: Marty & Emu
MUSICAL GROUP OF THE YEAR: The Frocks
COMPERE OF THE YEAR: Roy Cooper
VENUE OF THE YEAR: Burwood RSL
SELF CONTAINED ACT OF THE YEAR: Chris Connolly
HALL OF FAME: The Flanagans
COMEDY ACT OF THE YEAR: Darren Carr
PRODUCTION SHOW OF THE YEAR: Wayne Rogers
COUNTRY SOLO/GROUP/BAND OF THE YEAR: Wayne Horsburgh
TECHNICAL SUPPORT OF THE YEAR: Burwood RSL
TRIBUTE SHOW OF THE YEAR: Peter Byrne''
VOCALIST OF THE YEAR: Mark Vincent
ENTERTAINER OF THE YEAR: Wayne Horsburgh

References

External links
 

Australian theatre awards
Awards established in 1975
Awards disestablished in 2016